Jehol (an irregular romanization of Chinese Rèhé'ér, or an original Mongolian or Manchu form) may refer to:
 Jehol Province, another name for the former Chinese province of Rehe
 Jehol (city), a former name of the city now known as Chengde
 Jehol Mountains, now usually known as the Yin Mountains
 Roman Catholic Diocese of Jehol